Barsukovo (Burhıq) is a rural locality (a selo) in Dyurtyulinsky Selsoviet, Sharansky District, Bashkortostan, Russia. The population was 269 as of 2010. There are 3 streets.

Geography 
Barsukovo is located 17 km west of Sharan (the district's administrative centre) by road. Zirikly is the nearest rural locality.

References 

Rural localities in Sharansky District